Belnapia moabensis  is a Gram-negative, aerobic, facultatively fermentative and non-motile bacterium from the genus of Belnapia which has been isolated from biological soil crusts in the United States.

References

Further reading

External links
Type strain of Belnapia moabensis at BacDive -  the Bacterial Diversity Metadatabase	

Rhodospirillales
Bacteria described in 2006